Alexander McQueen is a British luxury fashion house founded by designer Alexander McQueen in 1992. Its current creative director is Sarah Burton.

History

The Alexander McQueen brand was 
founded by designer Alexander McQueen in 1992. The house's early collections developed its reputation for controversy and shock tactics (earning the title "l'enfant terrible" and "the hooligan of English fashion"), with trousers aptly named "bumsters" and a collection entitled Highland Rape. Alexander McQueen staged lavish and unconventional runway shows, such as a recreation of a shipwreck for his Spring 2003 collection, Spring 2005's human chess game, and the Fall 2006 show, Widows of Culloden, which featured a life-sized hologram of supermodel Kate Moss dressed in yards of rippling fabric. In total, McQueen designed 36 collections for his London label, including his MA graduate collection.

During his time as head designer, McQueen was awarded the title "British Designer of the Year" four times between 1996 and 2003; he was also appointed a CBE and named International Designer of the Year by the Council of Fashion Designers in 2003.

In December 2000, the Gucci Group acquired 51% of his company and appointed him as Creative Director before launching stores in London, Milan, New York, Los Angeles and Las Vegas. On 31 October 2011, Alexander McQueen opened its first store in Beijing with a runway show. Following the takeover, the brand's catwalk presentations were relocated from London to Paris, beginning with the Spring/Summer 2002 collection with The Dance of The Twisted Bull on 6 October 2001.

Alexander McQueen launched its first menswear collection in Spring/Summer 2005 and continues to show its collections during Milan Fashion Week. The company launched its first women's pre-Spring collection on the runway with its men's collection on 22 June 2008 and has since continued releasing cruise collections since Spring 2010.

Alexander McQueen launched an online store in the US in 2008. This was later expanded with an online store for the UK market in 2010.

McQueen's suicide was announced on the afternoon of 11 February 2010. At the time of his death, the company had debts of £32 million despite posting profits from handbag sales in 2008.

Sarah Burton, who was McQueen's deputy for 14 years, became the creative director for the Alexander McQueen label after his death. The company continued to expand globally in the following years, and its product range also expanded. The number of McQueen stores worldwide had increased to 100 by the end of 2020, with revenues estimated to be €500m in 2020.

McQ

On 27 July 2006, the company launched a lower-priced diffusion line McQ. The new line carries men's and women's ready-to-wear and accessories, was exclusively designed by Lee Alexander McQueen, manufactured and distributed worldwide by SINV SpA under the terms of a five-year licence agreement with Alexander McQueen. Promoted as a denim line, the focus of McQ is a youthful target market. The Spring/Summer 2011 was the final collection in collaboration with SINV SpA. Pina Ferlisi was appointed as the creative director for the line in June 2010.

Following the expiration of the contract with SINV SpA with the Spring/Summer 2011 collection, the brand announced on 11 October 2010 that it would take control of the McQ diffusion line by creating a new internal team with the creative direction of Pina Ferlisi, under the leadership of Alexander McQueen creative director Sarah Burton. For the first campaign for the re-acquired line, photographer Niall O'Brien collaborated with McQ by driving across the American Northwest capturing images, which evoked the McQ attitude.

In August 2011, the company announced it would launch its first McQ standalone boutique in London in 2012. In November 2011, it announced that McQ would be presented at London Fashion Week for the first time in February 2012, and that the new four-storey Georgian townhouse boutique will stock womenswear, menswear, and accessories.

Collaborations 
Between 1996 and 2001, Alexander McQueen collaborated with jeweller Shaun Leane on bespoke jewellery pieces for the catwalk presentations.

In January 2003, Alexander McQueen collaborated with perfumer Jacques Cavallier to launch his first fragrance Kingdom, which was launched on the designer's birthday 17 March. A limited edition version of the fragrance was launched in 2004. The company launched its second fragrance, My Queen three years later in 2006. On 10 October 2003, Alexander McQueen collaborated with Michael Clark to stage the Spring 2004 collection. On 15 October 2003, Alexander McQueen collaborated with Björk at Fashion Rocks where the Fall 2003 collection was presented at the Royal Albert Hall.

In 2004, Alexander McQueen collaborated with Safilo via a licensing deal to launch an eyewear range. The 2010 collection featured the house's trademark skull detail. The same year, the company collaborated with American Express to launch a limited-edition version of its ultra-exclusive Centurion Card. The card is available by invitation only to AMEX Platinum card members. To launch the card, McQueen hosted a retrospective of his collections from 1995 till Fall 2003.

In 2005, Alexander McQueen collaborated with Puma to produce a line of men's and women's footwear launched in Spring 2006. The Alexander McQueen PUMA line is founded on the union of tradition and technology, with juxtaposing influences. In 2008, the line's Fall 2009 collection was fully expanded to include men's and women's clothing and accessories, with a collaboration with film director Saam Farahmand to produce a 4-minute movie Ghost as an ad campaign for the collection.

In 2007, Alexander McQueen became the first brand to participate in MAC's promotion of cosmetic releases created by fashion designers. The collection was released on 11 October and reflected the looks used on the Autumn/Winter McQueen catwalk. The inspiration for the collection was the Elizabeth Taylor movie Cleopatra, and thus the models sported intense blue, green, and teal eyes with strong black liner extended Egyptian-style.

In 2008, Alexander McQueen collaborated with mass market retailer Target as McQ Alexander McQueen for Target. The company was the first collaboration between Target and an international designer. McQueen cited Leila Moss of The Duke Spirit as his muse for the collection. The collection was launched on 4 March 2009, with the band playing at the launch party. The same year, Alexander McQueen collaborated with Samsonite to produce luggage formed using a mould of a human ribcage and sternum on the front and spine on the back. Other pieces in the collection apply animal patterns like crocodile to the bags skin using laser cutting technology. With the catwalk presentations, Alexander McQueen collaborated with Philip Treacy to produce hats for the Spring 2008 collection, and again with the Fall 2009 collection.

During first semester of 2009, McQueen also collaborated with dancer Sylvie Guillem, director Robert Lepage and choreographer Russell Maliphant, designing wardrobe for theater show "Eonnagata", directed by Robert Lepage. The film "Sylvie Guillem, on the edge" produced by French production company A DROITE DE LA LUNE, traces whole history of the creation of the show, from first rehearsals which took place in Quebec until world premiere which was held in 2008 at Sadler's Wells theater in London.

On 6 October 2009, the company collaborated with SHOWstudio to stream its Spring/Summer 2010 collection Plato's Atlantis live on the company's website. The shoes from that collection were later featured on the SHOWstudio website. The same year, the company collaborated with Unkle who produced music for the McQ Autumn/Winter 2009 collection titled McQ. The collaboration was a success, and was extended a second season for the McQ Spring/Summer 2010 collection where the promotional CD was given out in a McQ press goodie bag.

In June 2010, Visionaire magazine's 58th issue, titled Spirit: A Tribute To Lee Alexander McQueen, was released as a tribute to the late founder. The issue featured images and discussions with editors who had met McQueen in 2003 to discuss the collaboration which never materialised. The issue also features contributions from Lady Gaga, Steven Klein, Nick Knight and Mario Testino Only 1,500 numbered copies were made, with pages made from seeded paper, which will sprout wildflowers once planted signifying the ongoing legacy of McQueen.

Controversies 

Alexander McQueen first caused controversy with his Spring/Summer 1995 collection which featured his signature "bumster trousers". At the time, the trousers were described as indecent as they barely covered the natural downward curve of the buttocks. He followed this by entitling his Autumn/Winter 1995 collection Highland Rape which he explained was about the "rape" of Scotland by the English, a subject that had a personal resonance as his family is of Scottish descent. The collection featured tattered dresses made of scraps of tartan and chiffon and a tampon-strewn skirt.

In 1998, Alexander McQueen photographed Aimee Mullins and sent her down the catwalk with intricately carved wooden legs – making her the first amputee to ever be featured on the catwalk. For the untitled Spring/Summer 1999 catwalk show, Shalom Harlow's white cotton dress was sprayed by car robots as she was spun around a platform. Animal rights activists and heavy police presence due to a reported bomb scare were present at the Autumn/Winter 2000 Eshu catwalk show, due to the extensive use of fur and leather in the collection.

McQueen was accused of misogyny following the Autumn/Winter 2009 The Horn of Plenty catwalk show where models with huge, overdrawn red and black lips were compared to a blow-up sex doll and hats made from found objects and rubbish like aluminium cans and duct tape implied models themselves were trash. Similarly, the Autumn/Winter 2010 An Bailitheor Cnámh menswear catwalk show featured men in masks and netted headgear that alluded to sadomasochism or bondage, and one of the suits was printed with human skulls and bones.

For the Spring/Summer 2010 Plato's Atlantis catwalk show, models refused to wear the now iconic 12 inch high armadillo shoes due to safety fears. One of the models who refused, had fainted in the Spring/Summer 2009 Natural Dis-tinction Un-natural Selection catwalk show after being squeezed into a corset which was too tight. Lady Gaga wore a pair in her music video for "Bad Romance" and created a version in chocolate encrusted with sparkly sprinkles for her Christmas shop in 2011.

Selfridges department store in London caused controversy when they unveiled a window display showing one of his designs being hanged from the gallows. The store later apologised, saying that "presenting a fashion item from the new Alexander McQueen collection hanging was never intended to be linked to the designer's untimely death or how he died."

In October 2010, The Hell's Angels filed a lawsuit against the company for "misusing its trademark winged death heads symbol" in several items from its Autumn/Winter 2010 collection. The lawsuit was widely reported across all media, The US$2,325 "Hell's Angels Knuckleduster Box clutch" handbag and US$560 "Hells Angels Pashmina" scarf was also named in lawsuit. The lawyer representing Hells Angels claimed "This isn't just about money, it's about membership. If you've got one of these rings on, a member might get really upset that you're an imposter." The group is demanding that the companies stop producing the products, recall any items in distribution and pay damages totalling three times whatever profit they made on the products. SAKS refused to comment, Zappos had no immediate comment and the company's parent company, PPR, could not be reached for comment. The company settled the case with the Hell's Angels after agreeing to remove all of the merchandise featuring the logo from sale on their website, stores and concessions and recalling any of the goodies which have already been sold and destroying them.

Similarly, costume designer Jany Temime was exposed for copying a dress from the Autumn/Winter 2008 collection The Girl Who Lived in the Tree, for her work on Harry Potter and the Deathly Hallows. Temime had claimed that she "wanted it to be a witch wedding dress but not a Halloween dress. The dress is white but it needed to have something fantastic to it. So there is the phoenix [motif], the bird, which is a symbol of love in a way because there is rebirth, love never dies, it is born again." However, the birds on the McQueen original were actually peacocks, and although Temime did manage to change the crest on the bird's heads to make them more 'phoenixy', she neglected to alter any other detail of the birds, including their rather obvious peacock feathers.
 The story was widely reported by the fashion media.

Post-Lee Alexander McQueen through today

On 18 February 2010, Robert Polet, the president and chief executive of the Gucci Group, announced that the Alexander McQueen business would carry on without its founder and creative director. He also added that a McQueen collection would be presented during Paris Fashion Week.

On 27 May 2010, Sarah Burton, McQueen's right hand design aide since 1996, was announced as the new creative director of the Alexander McQueen brand, with further plans to launch a men's underwear collection in June 2010. The underwear line featured iconic prints from the McQueen archive and the logo on the waistband, with a percentage of the launch collection of Alexander McQueen underwear to be given to various AIDS charities around the world.

Burton launched her first menswear show Pomp and Circumstance under the McQueen brand in June 2010 to generally positive reviews, which noted how low-key the event was. She launched the brand's womenswear resort collection shortly after, which was praised for lightness and having 'a woman's touch'. Burton showed her first womenswear show on 5 October 2010 in Paris, where she said her vision for the brand would be "lighter". The show was praised for being one of the strongest shows at Paris Fashion Week, "full of McQueen trademarks and ideas" and a "far more optimistic sensibility". Michael Jackson's "I'll Be There" was played at the finale of the show.

Creative director Sarah Burton designed the dress worn by Catherine Middleton during her wedding to Prince William, Duke of Cambridge on Friday 29 April 2011.

An analysis of online chatter shows that Alexander McQueen creates the most intense feelings of brand passion amongst wedding dress designers in the NetBase Brand Passion Index.

The Metropolitan Museum of Art in New York City hosted a posthumous exhibition of McQueen's work in 2011 titled Savage Beauty. Despite being open for only three months, it was one of the most popular exhibitions in the museum's history. The exhibition was so successful that Alexander McQueen fans and industry professionals worldwide began rallying at Change.org to "Please Make Alexander McQueen's Savage Beauty a Traveling Exhibition" to bring honour to McQueen and see his vision become a reality: to share his work with the entire world. This exhibition celebrated McQueen's vision and creativity. It comprised one hundred of its most famous designs, taken from its archive in London.

The exhibition Savage Beauty was brought to the Victoria & Albert Museum in London from 14 March 2015 to 2 August 2015.

On 28 November 2011, Sarah Burton won the Designer of the Year at the 2011 British Fashion Awards.

As of January 2014, Harley Hughes is Alexander "McQueen's head of men's wear design" during the Fall 2014 fashion show. After the show, both Sarah Burton, the creative director, and Harley Huges, took a bow to the public.

In July 2015, Catherine Middleton (now Catherine, Princess of Wales), wore an all-cream Alexander McQueen outfit for Princess Charlotte's christening.

In May 2016, at UNESCO Headquarters, Alexander McQueen brand won Prix Versailles for its rue Saint-Honoré boutique, in Paris.

Ownership and shareholdings 
 Kering

Creative Directors

Retail Stores 
AMQ and McQ operated by Alexander McQueen Ltd. and Kering S.A., with YOOX S.p.A. as online retailer since 2011.

 Asia: 23 (China, Hong Kong (5), Macau (3), Japan, Korea, Thailand, Philippines, Malaysia, Indonesia)
 New Zealand: 1 (Auckland)
 Australia: 1 (Melbourne)
 Europe: 7 (London (2), Milan, Moscow (2), Paris, & Vienna)
 Middle East: 4 (Abu Dhabi & Dubai (2), Qatar)
 United States: 6 (Dallas, Las Vegas, Los Angeles, Miami, New York, & San Francisco)
 Canada: 1 (toronto)

Other/Department stores 
 Marais Australia
 Harrods
 Harvey Nichols
 Joyce
 Saks Fifth Avenue
 Bergdorf Goodman
 Selfridges
 Neiman Marcus
 Bloomingdale's
 Barney's New York
 Nordstrom
 Tsum
 David Jones
 Harrolds

List of Alexander McQueen collections 
Alexander McQueen collections each featured a title revolving around the specific theme for each collection and show. The tradition ended for Fall 2010 with McQueen's death, and subsequent collections were launched without titles. The list excludes pre-collections and accessories lines.

Womenswear mainline catwalk collections:
 1992 Graduate Collection – Jack The Ripper Stalks His Victims 
 Autumn/Winter 1993 – Taxi Driver 
 Spring/Summer 1994 – Nihilism 
 Autumn/Winter 1994 – Banshee 
 Spring/Summer 1995 – The Birds 
 Autumn/Winter 1995 – Highland Rape
 Spring/Summer 1996 – The Hunger
 Autumn/Winter 1996 – Dante
 Spring/Summer 1997 – Bellmer La Poupee
 Autumn/Winter 1997 – It's A Jungle Out There
 Spring/Summer 1998 – Untitled (Originally The Golden Shower)
 Autumn/Winter 1998 – Joan
 Spring/Summer 1999 – No. 13
 Autumn/Winter 1999 – The Overlook
 Spring/Summer 2000 – Eye
 Autumn/Winter 2000 – Eshu
 Spring/Summer 2001 – Voss
 Autumn/Winter 2001 – What A Merry-Go-Round
 Spring/Summer 2002 – The Dance of The Twisted Bull
 Autumn/Winter 2002 – Supercalifragilistic
 Spring/Summer 2003 – Irere
 Autumn/Winter 2003 – Scanners
 Spring/Summer 2004 – Deliverance
 Autumn/Winter 2004 – Pantheon ad Lucem"
 Spring/Summer 2005 – It's Only a Game Autumn/Winter 2005 – The Man Who Knew Too Much Spring/Summer 2006 – Neptune Autumn/Winter 2006 – The Widows of Culloden Spring/Summer 2007 – Sarabande Autumn/Winter 2007 – In Memory of Elizabeth Howe, Salem, 1692 Spring/Summer 2008 – La Dame Bleue Autumn/Winter 2008 – The Girl Who Lived in the Tree Spring/Summer 2009 – Natural Dis-tinction Un-natural Selection Autumn/Winter 2009 – The Horn of Plenty Spring/Summer 2010 – Plato's Atlantis Autumn/Winter 2010 – Angels & Demons(Unofficially titled)
 Spring/Summer 2011 – Untitled
 Autumn/Winter 2011 – Untitled
 Spring/Summer 2012 – Untitled
 Autumn/Winter 2012 – Untitled
 Spring/Summer 2013 – Untitled
 Autumn/Winter 2013 – Untitled
 Spring/Summer 2014 – Untitled
 Autumn/Winter 2014 – Untitled
 Spring/Summer 2015 – Untitled
 Autumn/Winter 2015 – The Spirit of the Rose

Menswear mainline catwalk collections:

 Autumn/Winter 2004 – Textist Spring/Summer 2005 – Untitled
 Autumn/Winter 2005 – Untitled
 Spring/Summer 2006 – Killa Autumn/Winter 2006 – Untitled
 Spring/Summer 2007 – Harlem Autumn/Winter 2007 – The Forgotten Spring/Summer 2008 – Please, Sur Autumn/Winter 2008 – Pilgrim Spring/Summer 2009 – Love You Autumn/Winter 2009 – The McQueensbury Rules Spring/Summer 2010 – An Alexander Film Directed by David Sims Autumn/Winter 2010 – An Bailitheor Cnámh Spring/Summer 2011 – Pomp and Circumstance''
 Autumn/Winter 2011 – Untitled
 Spring/Summer 2012 – Untitled
 Autumn/Winter 2012 – Untitled
 Spring/Summer 2013 – Untitled
 Autumn/Winter 2013 – Untitled
 Spring/Summer 2014 – Untitled
 Autumn/Winter 2014 – Untitled
 Spring/Summer 2015 – Untitled
 Autumn/Winter 2015 – Untitled
 Spring/Summer 2016 – The Sea

References

External links 

Alexander McQueen Website
Alexander McQueen's McQ Website

Alexander McQueen
Clothing companies based in London
Clothing companies of England
Clothing brands of the United Kingdom
Haute couture
High fashion brands
Luxury brands
Savile Row Bespoke Association members
British companies established in 1992
Design companies established in 1992
Clothing companies established in 1992
1992 establishments in England
British brands
Kering brands